Chamber Music is the second studio album by American nu metal band Coal Chamber, released on Roadrunner Records on September 7, 1999. The album has industrial elements, most notably on their cover of "Shock the Monkey". The shift in sound was influenced by the involvement of several keyboardists, such as Jay Gordon and Amir Derakh of Orgy, DJ Lethal of Limp Bizkit and production assistance from Dave Ogilvie of Skinny Puppy. It is their second-most successful record and achieved moderate commercial and positive critical success.

Content
With this record, Coal Chamber purposely distanced their sound from that of Korn who they were often compared to because of the prominent influence on Coal Chamber's debut album. Many of the songs on Chamber Music are notably more melodic than that of its predecessor. Their cover of Peter Gabriel's "Shock the Monkey", featuring guest vocals by Ozzy Osbourne, helped launch the band into the mainstream music scene as well. A music video was produced for "Shock the Monkey", and the song received notable radio airplay for a time; the album sold over 270,000 copies in the US.

The song "What's in Your Mind?" opens with a lengthy example of backmasking. The song "Tyler's Song" was featured on the soundtrack of the film Scream 3.

Track listing
All songs written by Mike Cox/B. Dez Fafara/Rayna Foss/Miguel Rascón except where noted.

Personnel

Coal Chamber
B. Dez Fafara – lead vocals
 Meegs Rascón – guitars, backing vocals and keyboards on "Untrue"
 Rayna Foss-Rose – bass
 Mike "Bug" Cox – drums

Production
 Jay Baumgardner – mixing
 Amir Derakh – additional mixing
 David Bianco – mixing on "Tyler's Song", "What's In Your Mind?" and "Feed My Dreams"
 David "The Rave" Ogilvie – mixing on "Shock The Monkey"
 Chad Fridirici – engineering
 Brian Virtue – engineering
 Mike Parnan – additional engineering
 Troy Van Leeuwen – technical assistance
 Josh Abraham – producer

Guest musicians

 Brian Levine – strings arrangement
 Troy Van Leeuwen – keyboards
 Brian Virtue – programming
 Josh Abraham – keyboards and programming
 Ozzy Osbourne – guest vocals (on "Shock the Monkey")
 E. Blue – keyboards and guest vocals (on "Shock the Monkey" and "My Mercy")
 Anthony "Fu" Valic – additional programming (on "Shock the Monkey")
 Phil Western – additional programming (on "Shock the Monkey")
 Aimee Echo – guest vocals (on "Burgundy" and "My Mercy")
 Jay Gordon – keyboards (on "Burgundy")
 Amir Derakh – percussion synth (on "No Home"), keyboards (on "Notion"), micromoog (on "Anything But You")
 Georgie the Pug – panting  (on "Shari Vegas")
 Jay Baumgardner – keyboards (on "Notion")
 DJ Lethal – freaky fractures (on "Notion")

Chart positions

Album

References

1999 albums
Coal Chamber albums
Roadrunner Records albums
Albums produced by Josh Abraham